Senator Paxton may refer to:

Angela Paxton (fl. 2010s), Texas State Senate
Ken Paxton (born 1962), Texas State Senate
Lonnie Paxton (politician) (born 1968), Oklahoma State Senate
William A. Paxton (1837–1907), Nebraska State Senate
William T. Paxton (1869–1942), Virginia State Senate